Legio II (Latin for "Legion 2") may refer to:

 Legio II Adiutrix, the Second Rescuer Legion
 Legio II Gallica, the Second Gallic Legion
 Legio II Italica, the Second Italian Legion
 Legio II Herculia, the Second Herculean Legion
 Legio II Augusta, the Second Augustan Legion
 Legio II Armeniaca, the Second Armenian Legion
 Legio II Flavia Virtutis, the Brave Second Flavian Legion
 Legio II Flavia Constantia, the Reliable Second Flavian Legion
 Legio II Traiana Fortis, the Valiant Second Trajanian Legion
 Legio II Isaura, the Second Isaurian Legion
 Legio II Parthica, the Second Parthian Legion